Savitz is a surname. Notable people with the surname include:

David A. Savitz, American epidemiologist
Ed Savitz (1942–1993), American businessman and criminal